Pittsburgh Panthers women's basketball is the NCAA Division I intercollegiate women's basketball program of the University of Pittsburgh, often referred to as "Pitt", located in Pittsburgh, Pennsylvania. The Pitt women's basketball team competes in the Atlantic Coast Conference and plays their home games in the Petersen Events Center. The university first sponsored women's basketball on the varsity level in 1914 and have appeared in five straight national post-season tournaments between 2006 and 2010.

History

Women's intercollegiate varsity basketball at the University of Pittsburgh began during the 1914–1915  season and found early success until 1926–1927 after which it was disbanded in favor of intramural sports programs.  Varsity basketball for women was reinstated during the 1970–1971 season.  Although participants were awarded varsity letters and competed intercollegiately, the program wasn't taken over by the Athletic Department until the 1974–1975 season. During the 1970s, the team earned several EAIAW regional tournament appearances. Pitt began competing in the Big East Conference in 1982, and the Panthers won the Big East regular season championship in 1984. Pitt appeared in the National Women's Invitational Tournament in 1981 and 1994 as well as the Women's National Invitation Tournament in 2000 and 2006 before earning its first ever NCAA tournament appearance in 2007, where they advanced to the second round before losing to eventual national champion Tennessee. The Panthers then advanced to the Sweet Sixteen in 2008 and 2009, and made their fifth straight post-season tournament appearance in the WNIT in 2010. On April 12, 2013, Pitt hired Suzie McConnell-Serio to replace Berenato as head coach. Pitt moved to the Atlantic Coast Conference (ACC) beginning with the 2013–14 season.

Postseason

NCAA (4): 2007, 2008, 2009, 2015
Pitt reached the "Sweet Sixteen" in 2008 and 2009.

NWIT and WNIT (5): 1981, 1994, 2000, 2006, 2010
Pitt was the NWIT Consolation Winner in 1981 (5th Place), won the NWIT Third Place game in 1994, and reached the WNIT "Final Four" in 2006.

EAIAW regional championship tournaments (6):
1976, 1977, 1978, 1979, 1980, 1981

Honors

All Americans
Jennifer Bruce, 1984–85 WBCA All-District All-American
Lorri Johnson, 1990–91 WBCA All-District All-American
Jonna Huemrich, 1993–94 Honorable Mention All-American
Marcedes Walker, 2006–07 WBCA District I All-American
Marcedes Walker, 2007–08 WBCA District I All-American
Shavonte Zellous, 2008–09 AP Third Team All-American and WBCA Region I All-American

Academic All-Americans
Pam Miklasevich, 1981 College Sports Information Directors of America

Conference honors
Jennifer Bruce won Big East Player of the Year in 1984
Judy Saurer won Big East Coach of the Year in 1984
Jonna Huemrich won Big East Rookie of the Year in 1991
Traci Waites won Big East Coach of the Year in 2000
Shavonte Zellous won Big East Most Improved Player in 2007

Points club
17 total Panther players have achieved the 1,000 points club with three scoring over 2,000 points.

*Winn played at Georgia Tech from 2002 to 2004 prior to transferring to Pitt.  She scored 812 of her 1,028 career points at Pitt.
PPG = points per game

Retired jerseys
 Lorri Johnson #24

WNBA
The following former Pitt basketball players have or are currently playing in the WNBA.
 Laine Selwyn, Indiana Fever, 2008
 Marcedes Walker, Houston Comets, 2008
 Shavonte Zellous, Detroit Shock, 2009–present

Draft
The following players were selected in the WNBA draft.

2009 Shavonte Zellous, 1st round, 11th pick, Detroit Shock
2015 Brianna Kiesel, 2nd round, 13th pick, Tulsa Shock

Year by year results

Pitt's varsity women's basketball program, the only women's varsity sport at the school during that time, was started in the 1914–15 season and continued until 1926–1927 when it was dropped in favor of a  program of intramural women's athletics that could provide more opportunities for the co-eds at the university. The varsity women's basketball program was revived for the 1970–71 season and moved under the auspices of the athletic department in 1974–75. Records prior to the 1974–75 are largely incomplete (see notes).
{|class="wikitable" style="font-size:95%"
! Season
! Coach
! Overall
! Conference 
! Standing
! Postseason
! Coaches' poll
! AP poll
! Notes

|-
|1914–15||H. H. Provin||?-1||—||—||||||||incomplete records, reported all wins but 1 loss
|-
|1915–16||H. H. Provin||7–0||—||—||||||||
|-
|1916–17||H. H. Provin||6–0||—||—||||||||
|-
|1917–18||H. H. Provin||9–1||—||—||||||||
|-
|1918–19||H. H. Provin||8–0||—||—||||||||not including win over Alumnae
|-
|1919–20||H. H. Provin||8–0||—||—||||||||one win by forfeit

|-
|1920–21||A. Lemon Arnold||9–0||—||—||||||||3 game results unknown

|-
|1921–22||Margaret A. McClenahan||6–1||—||—||||||||incomplete records
|-
|1922–23||Margaret A. McClenahan||6–3–1||—||—||||||||one tie, not including win over Freshman
|-
|1923–24||Margaret A. McClenahan||8–1||—||—||||||||not including win over Alumnae;2 wins over Temple found onlyin Temple's media guide
|-
|1924–25||Margaret A. McClenahan||9–0||—||—||||||||not including win over Alumnae
|-
|1925–26||Margaret A. McClenahan||2-?||—||—||||||||7-game season, incomplete records
|-
|1926–27||Margaret A. McClenahan||4–2||—||—||||||||not including win over Alumnae

|-
|1970–71||Sandra Bullman||9–2||—||—||||||||individual game results unknown
|-
|1971–72||Sandra Bullman||4–2||—||—||||||||
|-
|1972–73||Sandra Bullman||?-?||—||—||||||||unknown results
|-
|1973–74||Sandra Bullman||?-?||—||—||||||||unknown results

|-
|1974–75||Jean Condo||10–6||—||—||||||||

|-
|1975–76||Pat Wallace||16–8||—||—||EAIAW Regional (3–1, consolation champions)||||||
|-
|1976–77||Pat Wallace||19–8||—||—||EAIAW Regional (1–2)||||||

|-
|1977–78||Jean Balthaser||14–14||—||—||EAIAW Regional (1–1)||||||
|-
|1978–79||Jean Balthaser||12–17||—||—||EAIAW Regional (0–1)||||||
|-
|1979–80||Jean Balthaser||21–11||—||—||EAIAW Regional (0–1)||||||

|-
|1980–81||Judy Saurer||22–7||—||—||NWIT Fifth PlaceRegionals (0–1)||||||
|-
|1981–82||Judy Saurer||14–14||—||—||||||||
|-
|1982–83||Judy Saurer||17–11||5–3||3rd|||||||||
|- style="background:#ffdd99" 
|1983–84||Judy Saurer||16–12||6–2||T-1st|||||||||
|-
|1984–85||Judy Saurer||16–12||10–6||T-4th||||||||

|-
|1985–86||Kirk Bruce||11–16||5–11||6th||||||||
|-
|1986–87||Kirk Bruce||7–21||1–15||9th||||||||
|-
|1987–88||Kirk Bruce||14–15||5–11||7th||||||||
|-
|1988–89||Kirk Bruce||11–17||3–13||9th||||||||
|-
|1989–90||Kirk Bruce||15–14||6–10||6th||||||||
|-
|1990–91||Kirk Bruce||16–13||10–6||T-3rd||||||||
|-
|1991–92||Kirk Bruce||11–18||6–12||7th||||||||
|-
|1992–93||Kirk Bruce||15–12||10–8||T-4th||||||||
|-
|1993–94||Kirk Bruce||21–10||12–6||3rd||NWIT Third Place|||||||
|-
|1994–95||Kirk Bruce||17–11||10–8||T-4th||||||||
|-
|1995–96||Kirk Bruce||6–24||3–15||7th (BE 7)||||||||
|-
|1996–97||Kirk Bruce||8–22||3–15||7th (BE 7)||||||||
|-
|1997–98||Kirk Bruce||6–21||3–15||7th (BE 7)||||||||

|-
|1998–99||Traci Waites||8–19||3–15||T-12th|||||||||
|-
|1999–2000||Traci Waites||16–13||7–9||T-6th||WNIT first round||||||
|-
|2000–01||Traci Waites||9–18||3–13||T-12th||||||||
|-
|2001–02||Traci Waites||8–19||3–13||13th||||||||
|-
|2002–03||Traci Waites||12–16||4–12||T-11th||||||||

|-
|2003–04||Agnus Berenato||6–20||2–14||13th||||||||
|-
|2004–05||Agnus Berenato||13–15||5–11||10th||||||||
|-
|2005–06||Agnus Berenato||22–11||9–7||T-6th||WNIT semifinals||||||
|-
|2006–07||Agnus Berenato||24–9||10–6||T-5th||NCAA round of 32||||||
|-
|2007–08||Agnus Berenato||24–11||10–6||T-5th||NCAA Sweet Sixteen||16||||
|-
|2008–09||Agnus Berenato||25–8||12–4||3rd||NCAA Sweet Sixteen||15||15||
|-
|2009–10||Agnus Berenato||16–15||5–11||T-12th||WNIT first round||||||
|-
|2010–11||Agnus Berenato||14–17||5–11||12th||||||||
|-
|2011–12||Agnus Berenato||8–21||0–16||16th||||||||
|-
|2012–13||Agnus Berenato||9–21||0–16||15th||||||||

|-
|2013–14||Suzie McConnell-Serio||11–20||3–13||T-14th||||||||
|-
|2014–15||Suzie McConnell-Serio||20–12||9–7||7th||NCAA second round||||||
|-
|2015–16||Suzie McConnell-Serio||13–18||4–12||T-13th||||||||
|-
|2016–17||Suzie McConnell-Serio||13–17||4–12||T-11th||||||||
|-
|2017–18||Suzie McConnell-Serio||10–20||2–14||13th||||||||

|-
|2018–19||Lance White||11–20||2–14||14th||||||||
|-
|2019–20||Lance White||5–26||1–17||15th||||||||
|-
|2020–21||Lance White||5–14||3–12||12th||||||||
|-
|2021–22||Lance White|| 11–19 || 2–16 || T-14th||||||||
|-
| 2022–23 || Lance White || 10–20 || 3–15 || 15th || || || ||

NCAA tournament results

References

External links